"Hell Bent" is the twelfth and final episode of the ninth series of the British science fiction television series Doctor Who.  It was first broadcast on BBC One on 5 December 2015.

In the episode, the alien time traveller the Twelfth Doctor (Peter Capaldi) arrives on the planet Gallifrey after escaping imprisonment by his people, the Time Lords, and takes over as the new President. He tries in vain to use knowledge of "the Hybrid", which is prophesied by the Time Lords to stand in Gallifrey's ruins and unravel the Web of Time, to save the life of his companion Clara (Jenna Coleman). Doing so causes the Doctor and Clara themselves to become the Hybrid. This episode is Coleman’s final regular appearance as a companion.

Plot
On Gallifrey, the Twelfth Doctor has escaped from his confession dial after four and a half billion years of imprisonment, alerting the Time Lords. Aided by the Gallifreyan military, the Doctor usurps and exiles Lord President Rassilon. Now the new President, the Doctor learns that Rassilon imprisoned him in the dial to force him to confess about the Hybrid, which is prophesied by the Time Lords to stand in Gallifrey's ruins and unravel the Web of Time.

The Doctor has the Time Lords retrieve Clara from her timeline the instant before her death, with her biological processes suspended in a time loop, leaving her without a pulse, ostensibly so the Doctor can consult her about the Hybrid. The Doctor flees with Clara and steals a TARDIS from the workshops under the Capitol, telling her he held out confessing to have something to bargain for her life with.

The Doctor attempts to take Clara far enough away in the hope that her pulse will resume and she will not have to be returned to the moment of her death, despite potentially damaging time itself in the process.  When this fails, they go to the extreme end of the universe.  The Doctor finds the immortal human Ashildr waiting in the ruins of Gallifrey.  Ashildr theorises that the Doctor and Clara together are the Hybrid.  Since they are so alike, each pushes the other to potentially catastrophic actions.  The Doctor reveals his intention to erase Clara's memories of him, hoping that the Time Lords will not be able to find her. Overhearing them, Clara attempts to reverse the neuro block to backfire on the Doctor; Clara accepts her death, but insists on retaining her memory.  The two agree to activate the neuro block together, not knowing if Clara succeeded at reversing it.  The Doctor concedes that he became the Hybrid by trying to save Clara.

The Doctor's memories of Clara are erased. He awakens in the Nevada desert. In a diner, the Doctor tells his story about Gallifrey to Clara, dressed as a waitress; the Doctor has pieced together the hole left by the wipe aside from what Clara looks like. After Clara goes into the toilets, the diner, the TARDIS stolen from Gallifrey, disappears, leaving the Doctor behind and revealing the Doctor's TARDIS. Clara, travelling with Ashildr, begins her trip to Gallifrey to return to her death, "the long way 'round". The Doctor's TARDIS produces a new sonic screwdriver.

Continuity
The interior of the TARDIS that the Doctor and Clara steal to escape the Cloisters is modelled on the original, as seen in An Unearthly Child (1963). This is the first episode since "The End of Time" (2009–10) to feature Rassilon.  Clara uses the phrase "reversed the polarity" in modifying the memory wiping device; this is a phrase commonly associated with the Third Doctor, but has been used by other Doctors as well. The Doctor, once on Gallifrey, travels to the same barn in the Dry Lands where he spent time as a child, as seen in "Listen", and would later be where he debates the use of the Moment in "The Day of the Doctor" (2013).

Before deciding that the Doctor and Clara, combined, are the Hybrid, Ashildr postulated that the Doctor might be half-human and thus the Hybrid. The Eighth Doctor made a similar statement about his lineage in the 1996 television movie. When Ashildr knocks on the TARDIS's door, she knocks four times, which the Doctor points out. This is a reference to the Tenth Doctor's regeneration and the prophecy stating "He will knock four times" just before his death. When the Doctor decides to wipe Clara's memory of himself to save her, he mentions that he has done it before, telepathically, referring to the Tenth Doctor's wiping of Donna Noble's memory of him and her travels in the TARDIS in "Journey's End" (2008). The Doctor recognises the diner as the same one he visited as the Eleventh Doctor in "The Impossible Astronaut" with companions Amy Pond and Rory Williams.

The Cloister Wars were mentioned by Missy in "The Magician's Apprentice", along with the Doctor stealing "the moon and the President's wife." The Doctor sets the record straight in this episode (albeit inadvertently in his babbling when reunited with Clara after over four billion years), claiming that it was his daughter, not his wife, and that he did not steal the moon, he 'lost' it. The Doctor claims he rescued Clara because he has "a duty of care", a phrase mentioned before.

Foxes' version of "Don't Stop Me Now" is heard playing when the Doctor first walks into the diner; the song was also used in "Mummy on the Orient Express". The Doctor, while talking to the waitress, plays on an electric guitar, and at times plays variations on both Clara's theme, as composed by Murray Gold and heard first in "Asylum of the Daleks", and the "Bad Wolf" leitmotif.

Production
The read through for the episode took place on 4 August 2015, and filming began on 10 August 2015. The external scenes were shot over three days in Fuerteventura during late August.

Cast notes
Maisie Williams, who played Ashildr in "The Girl Who Died", "The Woman Who Lived" and "Face the Raven", appeared in this episode, as did Ken Bones, who reprised his role from "The Day of the Doctor" and Clare Higgins, who played Ohila. Timothy Dalton, who had previously played Rassilon in "The End of Time", was asked to reprise the role but was unavailable for filming. Donald Sumpter previously appeared as Enrico Casali in The Wheel in Space (1968) and as Commander Ridgeway in The Sea Devils (1972). He also appeared in The Eternity Trap (2009), a story from spin-off series The Sarah Jane Adventures, playing Erasmus Darkening. Jami Reid-Quarrell returned as a Wraith, after previously playing Colony Sarff in "The Magician's Apprentice" / "The Witch's Familiar", as well as the Veil in "Heaven Sent".

Reception
The episode was watched by 4.47 million viewers overnight in the UK, a 20.0% audience share. It received an Appreciation Index score of 82. The final figures were 6.17 million viewers with a 25.7% audience share.

Critical reception

"Hell Bent" received positive reviews from critics. The episode received a score of 86% on Rotten Tomatoes, with an average score of 8.05/10. The site's consensus reads "'Hell Bent' swerves from the expected storyline for the finale, and instead delivers a heartfelt resolution for The Doctor and his companion".

In his review for Digital Spy, Morgan Jeffery said the episode was "at points thrilling and affecting" but "it's the shaky climax that people will remember, and unfortunately that could end up overshadowing the episode's (many and various) good points."  Den of Geek's Simon Brew thought the episode was "a coherent, nerdy, often brilliant, sometimes a little frustrating, but always watchable piece of television". Amy Burns of the Independent found it to be "an emotional and humorous episode" although she admitted "not understanding about half of what happened."

Not all reviews were positive, however. John Hussey of Cult Fix criticised Clara's return, saying that "Face the Raven was a poetic ending for Clara and it should’ve been left alone, not dragged out with timey-wimey nonsense." He further went on to criticise the lack of resolution to the Hybrid Arc of the series, saying "it added very little to the series and resulted in nothing spectacular, other than pure speculation; essentially back where we started."

Notes

References

External links

Twelfth Doctor episodes
2015 British television episodes
Television episodes written by Steven Moffat
Fiction set in the 7th millennium or beyond
Television episodes about the end of the universe
Television episodes about death
Television episodes set in Nevada